Yuri Rudyk (born 11 November 1991) is a Ukrainian pair skater. With partner Julia Lavrentieva, he is a three-time Ukrainian national champion (2011–2012, 2014) and placed 11th at the 2013 European Championships.

Programs 
(with Lavrentieva)

Competitive highlights 
(with Lavrentieva)

References

External links 

 

Ukrainian male pair skaters
1991 births
Living people
Sportspeople from Kyiv
Figure skaters at the 2014 Winter Olympics
Olympic figure skaters of Ukraine